Italaman is a genus of South American anyphaenid sac spiders containing the single species, Italaman santamaria. It was  first described by Antônio Brescovit in 1997, and has only been found in Colombia, Brazil, and Argentina.

References

Anyphaenidae
Monotypic Araneomorphae genera
Spiders of South America
Taxa named by Antônio Brescovit